The 2011–12 Telemach League was the 21st season of the Premier A Slovenian Basketball League, the highest professional basketball league in Slovenia.
The first half of the season consisted of 10 teams and 90-game regular season (18 games for each of the 10 teams) began on Friday, 15 October 2011 and ended on 3 March 2012. The second half of the season consisted of 2 teams from Adriatic League and the best 6 teams from first half of the season.

Teams for the 2011–12 season

Regular season

A League standings

P=Matches played, W=Matches won, L=Matches lost, F=Points for, A=Points against, Pts=Points

Stats Leaders

Champions standings

P=Matches played, W=Matches won, L=Matches lost, F=Points for, A=Points against, Pts=Points

Relegation league

P=Matches played, W=Matches won, L=Matches lost, F=Points for, A=Points against, Pts=Points

Playoffs

Finals

Awards

Regular Season MVP
  Travis Nelson (Šentjur)

Season MVP
  Travis Nelson (Šentjur)

Finals MVP
  Afik Nissim (Krka)

Weekly MVP

Regular season

Note

 – Co-MVP's were announced.

Second round

Statistics leaders

| width=50% valign=top |

Points

|}
|}

| width=50% valign=top |

Assists

|}
|}

References

External links
Official Basketball Federation of Slovenia website 

Slovenian Basketball League seasons
Slovenia
1